Haplogroup X may refer to:

 Haplogroup X (mtDNA)
 Haplogroup K-M147 (Y-DNA), previously known as Haplogroup X; see: Haplogroup K2#Subclades